Entada is a genus of flowering plants in the family Fabaceae, in the mimosoid clade of the subfamily Caesalpinioideae. It consists of some 30 species of trees, shrubs and tropical lianas. About 21 species are known from Africa, six from Asia, two from the American tropics and one with a pantropical distribution. Their seeds are buoyant and survive lengthy journeys via rivers and ocean currents, to eventually wash up on tropical beaches.

Species
The following species have been accepted:
 Entada abyssinica Steudel ex A. Rich.
 Entada africana Guill. & Perr.
 Entada arenaria Schinz
 Entada bacillaris F.White   
 Entada borneensis Ridl.   
 Entada camerunensis Villiers   
 Entada chrysostachys (Benth.) Drake
 Entada dolichorrhachis Brenan   
 Entada gigas (L.) Fawc. & Rendle - sea heart, cœur de la mer (Pantropical)
 Entada glandulosa Gagnep.   
 Entada hockii De Wild.  
 Entada leptostachya Harms   
 Entada louvelii (R.Vig.) Brenan  
 Entada mannii (Oliv.) Tisser.  
 Entada mossambicensis Torre   
 Entada nudiflora Brenan   
 Entada parvifolia Merr.   
 Entada pervillei (Vatke) R.Vig.  
 Entada phaneroneura Brenan   
 Entada phaseoloides (L.) Merr. - St. Thomas bean (Oceania, East Asia)
 Entada polyphylla Benth.   
 Entada polystachya (L.) DC.
 Entada reticulata Gagnep.   
 Entada rheedii Spreng. - snuff box (sea) bean (Africa, South Asia, Southeast Asia, Australia); synonyms: E. pursaetha DC., E. monostachya DC.
 Entada spinescens Brenan   
 Entada spiralis Ridl.   
 Entada stuhlmannii (Taub.) Harms  
 Entada tuberosa R.Vig.   
 Entada wahlbergii Harv.

References

External links
 Madagascar Catalogue
 Taxonomy

 
Fabaceae genera